Fashion theory may refer to:

Theories of fashion
Fashion Theory, academic journal